Nesah-ye Mazkur va Nasrollah (also Romanized as Nesah-ye Maẕkūr va Naṣrollah) is a village in Sepidar Rural District, in the Central District of Boyer-Ahmad County, Kohgiluyeh and Boyer-Ahmad Province, Iran. At the 2006 census, its population was 24, with 4 families.

References 

Populated places in Boyer-Ahmad County